Senator Stone may refer to:

Members of the United States Senate
 David Stone (politician) (1770–1818), U.S. Senator from North Carolina
 Richard Stone (politician) (1928–2019), U.S. Senator from Florida

United States state senate members
 Ben Stone (politician) (born 1935), State Senator of Mississippi
 Bill Stone (politician) (born 1965), State Senator of Mississippi
 Charles Warren Stone (1843–1912), State Senator of Pennsylvania 
 Claude Stone Jr. (1926–2014), State Senator of Illinois
 Eben F. Stone (1822–1895), State Senator of Massachusetts
 Jeff Stone (California politician) (born 1956), State Senator of California
 John Marshall Stone (1830–1900), State Senator of Mississippi
 Norman R. Stone Jr. (born 1935), State Senator of Maryland
 Thomas Stone (1743–1787), State Senator of Maryland